Wonder Sporting is a former football club from Botswana based in Otse.

History 
The club played last in Botswana Premier League. The Club merged on 28 January 2014 with Botswana Police XI SC to Police XI FC.

Stadium
The team plays at the 2,000 capacity Otse Stadium.

League participations
Botswana Premier League: 2013
Botswana First Division South: ????–2013

Notable past players
 Duncan Kgopolelo

References

External links
Soccerway

Football clubs in Botswana
2014 disestablishments in Botswana